Devario gibber is a freshwater fish endemic to the Xe Kong and Xe Don basins in Laos. It occurs in stone-bottomed, clear streams with moderately fast to rapidly flowing water, and is uncommon in floodplains. It is caught in local subsistence fisheries, but not believed to be substantially impacted by them.

References

Cyprinid fish of Asia
Fish of Laos
Fish described in 2000
Devario